Juan Diego García López (born 18 November 2002) is a Mexican para taekwondo practitioner. He represented Mexico in the 2020 Summer Paralympics, where he won a gold medal in the 75kg event. He also participated in the 2019 Parapan American Games, where he won a gold medal in the same category.

References

External links
 Profile  at Olympics.com

2002 births
Living people
Medalists at the 2019 Parapan American Games
Medalists at the 2020 Summer Paralympics
Mexican male taekwondo practitioners
Paralympic gold medalists for Mexico
Paralympic medalists in taekwondo
Sportspeople from Culiacán
Taekwondo practitioners at the 2020 Summer Paralympics
21st-century Mexican people